Paloda was a literary magazine published in Bârlad, Romania. (Paloda is the old name of the city of Bârlad) The magazine was established on 5 February 1881 by Ştefan Neagoe. The magazine continued to appear until 1883 when it was replaced by the Tutova newspaper. Its publication restarted in 1893 and continued till 1908.

References

Defunct magazines published in Romania
Defunct literary magazines published in Europe
Magazines established in 1881
Magazines disestablished in 1908
Mass media in Bârlad
Romanian-language magazines
Literary magazines published in Romania
1881 establishments in Romania